Vince Carter (born 1977) is an American former professional basketball player.

Vince Carter may also refer to:

People
 Vincent Carter (1891–1972), U.S. Representative from Wyoming

Fictional characters
 Vince Carter (Gomer Pyle), U.S. Marine 
 Vince Carter (The Secret World of Alex Mack), security chief